Khatumeh (also Romanized as Khātūmeh; also known as Kalāteh-ye Khātūmeh) is a village in Zibad Rural District, Kakhk District, Gonabad County, Razavi Khorasan Province, Iran. At the 2006 census, its population was 19, in 8 families.

References 

Populated places in Gonabad County